Yocona is an unincorporated community in Lafayette County, in the U.S. state of Mississippi.

History
Yocona was founded in the 1840s, and named after the Yocona River.  A variant name was "Stringtown".

Notable people
 Pablo Sierra, former long-distance runner

References

Unincorporated communities in Mississippi
Unincorporated communities in Lafayette County, Mississippi
Mississippi placenames of Native American origin